The 2008 Puskás Cup was the first edition of the Puskás Cup and took place 2 April to 5 April. Real Madrid C.F. won their first title by defeating Puskás Akadémia FC 5-1 in the final.

Participating teams
 Budapest Honvéd FC (former club of Ferenc Puskás)
 Panathinaikos F.C. (former club of Ferenc Puskás)
 Puskás Academy (host)
 Real Madrid C.F. (former club of Ferenc Puskás)

Venues
Stadion Sóstói
Felcsút

Results

Goal scorers
Source: https://web.archive.org/web/20140531124719/http://www.puskassuzukicup.net/tortenet2008

4 goals
Fran Sol (Real Madrid)
1 goal
 Csurka (Puskás Academy)
 Ádám Gyurcsó (Puskás Academy)
 Makaronas (Panathinaikos)
 Boto (Real Madrid)
 De las Heras (Real Madrid)
 Exposito (Real Madrid)
 own goal
 Liolos (Panathinaikos)

References

External links
Official website

2008
2007–08 in Spanish football
2007–08 in Hungarian football
2007–08 in Greek football